Ewan Porter (born 4 July 1982) is an Australian former professional golfer who played on the PGA Tour of Australasia and the Nationwide Tour.

Porter was born in Sydney. He turned professional in 2002 and played on the PGA Tour of Australasia. He played on the Nationwide Tour in 2005 and 2008. He has two wins, the 2008 Moonah Classic and the 2010 South Georgia Classic.

He now serves as a commentator on the Sky Sports broadcast of the European Tour in the UK.

Amateur wins
2001 New South Wales Medal

Professional wins (2)

PGA Tour of Australasia wins (1)

1Co-sanctioned by the Nationwide Tour

Nationwide Tour wins (2)

1Co-sanctioned by the PGA Tour of Australasia

Results in major championships

Note: Porter only played in The Open Championship.

CUT = missed the half-way cut

Team appearances
Amateur
Australian Men's Interstate Teams Matches (representing New South Wales): 2001

External links

Australian male golfers
PGA Tour golfers
PGA Tour of Australasia golfers
Golfers from Sydney
1982 births
Living people